AstitvaEk Prem Kahani was a Hindi-language soap opera that aired on Zee TV channel for more than three years. The story focuses on the concept of a women's identity through the character of Dr. Simran, who embodies patience, consistency, and suppression in a subtle way. She is a gynecologist who enters a complex situation when she marries a man ten years younger than herself. It shows the ensuing struggles in her life.

Synopsis 
Dr. Simran Mathur, a renowned gynecologist, is the eldest daughter of senior government officer Saurabh and homemaker Padma. Simran has two younger sisters, Kavita and Rashmi. Simran’s parents worry that their eldest daughter is unmarried and in her mid-thirties.

Simran operates on a critically ill patient, Anandi, saving her and her baby. Anandi’s brother, Abhimanyu Saxena (Abhi), is smitten by Dr. Simran. Abhi, a photographer, woos Simran, who resists his advances because he is ten years younger than she.

Eventually, Simran falls in love with Abhi, and when Abhi proposes to her, she agrees. Simran's and Abhi’s parents are against this match because of the age difference. Abhi and Simran elope and get married with the help of Simran’s good friend Dr. Manas. Urmila, Dr. Manas’s wife, is jealous of her husband's friendship with Simran.

Saurabh renounces his daughter and resigns from his job. He is depressed and angry because he believes his favorite daughter ruined her life, and he finds solace in the arms of his mistress, Anjali. Kavita, who lives at her parents' home with her husband Rohit, reveals that she has always been jealous of Simran for monopolising their father’s attention. Kavita takes this opportunity to get back at Simran by fueling fights with Saurabh.

Abhi’s parents invite the couple to live with them, but Simran is mistreated at Abhi’s house. Abhi's immaturity causes some friction in their relationship, but the couple is able to work things out. Abhi tastes success at work and employs a new assistant, Kiran. Simran is thrilled to learn that she is pregnant, but Abhi gets nervous about impending parenthood. He starts an extramarital affair with Kiran. Abhi abandons Simran emotionally while she goes through a complicated pregnancy. Simran gives birth to a girl, whom she names Aastha. Abhi wins accolades for his work and rises in his career. He introduces Kiran to his mother, who is impressed. Eventually, Saurabh breaks up with Anjali, and Kavita changes her attitude towards Simran. Soon they learn that Kavita has cancer, and she leaves for Switzerland for her treatment. Abhi marries Kiran after divorcing Simran. Kiran is pregnant with Abhi's child and aborts it on the advice of rich businessman Anil Shourie. Kiran leaves Abhi and goes to live with Shourie. Abhi marries Neha, and she is soon pregnant. Simran helps Neha give birth to a daughter, but shortly after, Neha dies. Simran takes a trip to London with Abhi,where someone kidnaps Aastha. Abhi's family want Simran to look after Neha's daughter. Simran agrees to raise her as her own, naming her Aastha, while Abhi disappears.

18 years later 
Abhi is a famous writer using the pen name Anand and lives as a recluse in Goa. A girl named Sia meets him, and after some misunderstandings, it is revealed that she is actually Abhi and Simran's daughter Astha. Sia was raised by the childless and mentally disturbed woman who had kidnapped her. Sia and Abhi reunite, and he takes her to Simran. Simran and Neha's daughter, Aastha, are living as mother and daughter. Aastha grows increasingly jealous as her best friend, Dr. Siddhant, starts to take an interest in Sia. Aastha herself has feelings for Siddhant, who is Manas and Urmila's son. Kiran tries to influence Aastha, who eventually sees through her intentions and reunites with Simran. Sia and Siddhant get engaged. The bus in which Simran and Astha are traveling becomes the target of a bomb blast. Aastha is killed, and Simran loses her eyesight. In the end, Simran gets her eyesight back through surgery. She and Abhi reunite.

Cast

Niki Aneja Walia as Dr. Simran Mathur / Dr. Simran Saxena, Saurabh and Padma's daughter Abhi's first and fourth wife, Siya's original mother, Aastha and Yash's adopted mother
Varun Badola as Abhimanyu Saxena a.k.a. Abhi (Dr. Simran's husband) / Writer Anand, Simran's first and third husband, Saurabh and Padma's son-in-law, Kiran's first husband, Siya, Yash and Aastha's father
Ajit Mehra as Mr. Mehta (Mehta Sab) (Abhimanyu Saxena / Anand and Bhavani's publisher) in Goa
 Komal Kumari as Baby Aastha
Yuvika Chaudhary as Aastha Saxena (Abhi and Neha's daughter - dead, died in bomb blast)
 Upasana Shukla as Siya Saxena / Aastha Saxena / Aastha Siddhant Awasthi (Abhi and Simran's daughter; she changes her name from Siya to Aastha in memory of her late sister Aastha)
 Vineeta Thakur as Neha (Abhi's third wife - dead, died soon after pregnancy and giving birth to Aastha)
Rajendra Chawla as Bhavani Shankar; Abhimanyu Saxena (Anand)'s friend 
Alok Nath as Saurabh Mathur (Padma's husband, Simran, Kavita and Rashmi's father, Abhi, Rohit and Pranay's father-in-law)
Harshada Khanvilkar as Shaguna (Simran's housekeeper)
Harsh Chhaya as Dr. Manas Awasthi (Simran's friend, Urmila's husband and Sid's father)
Bhairavi Raichura as Urmila (Manas's wife, Sid's mother)
Neeru Bajwa / Kamya Panjabi as Kiran (Abhi's second wife and Yash's mother)
Abbas Khan / Vishal Singh as Dr. Siddhant Awasthi a.k.a. Sid (Manas and Urmila's son; Aastha (Siya)'s husband; Abhi and Simran's son-in-law)
Sushil Parashar as Mr. Saxena (Abhi's father, Simran's father-in-law)
Kanika Shivpuri as Mrs. Saxena (Abhi's mother, Simran's mother-in-law)
Parmeet Sethi as Dr. Brian
Himani Shivpuri as Radha; Neha's mother, Aastha's (Abhi and Neha's daughter)'s grandmother
Mahesh Thakur as Dr. Abhimanyu Joshi a.k.a. Manu
Sindhu Tolani / Aanchal Saxena / Firdaus Dadi as Rashmi; Simran's sister
Nitesh Pandey as Dr. Pranay (Rashmi's second husband)
Resham Tipnis / Payal Nair as Kavita (Simran's sister) - dead, died soon after pregnancy
Sanjeev Seth as Rohit (Kavita's husband)
Nandita Puri as Padma (Saurabh's wife, Simran, Kavita and Rashmi's mother, Abhi, Rohit and Pranay's mother-in-law) - dead, died in sleep
Sunita as Anandi; Mr and Mrs. Saxena's daughter; Abhi's sister - dead, died soon after pregnancy
Ninad Kamat as Anandi's husband
Iqbal Azad/Imran Khan as Dr. Ashwin (Urmila's lover) - dead
Sonica Handa as Naghma (Manu's wife)
Anjali Mukhi as Gauri Joshi (Manu's sister)
Naveen Bawa as Dr. Abhimanyu Joshi's elder brother
Shalini Arora as Dr. Abhimanyu Joshi's sister-in-law
Manju as Dr. Meena 
Monaz Mevawala as Amisha Dalaal
Abha Dhulia as Dr. Sarla Dalaal
Neena Cheema as Sulochana
Pallavi Joshi as Leela 
Mrinal Kulkarni as Dr. Sakshi, Yash's girlfriend - dead, died in car accident
Raja Sevak as Dr. Sakshi's husband
Amit Raj as Yash Saxena, Abhi and Kiran's son; Dr. Sakshi's boyfriend; Simran's adoptive son
Malvika Shivpuri / Ananya Banerjee as Poonam
Nagesh Bhonsle as Shankar, Shaguna's husband
Mushtaq Merchant as Nishant
Trishna Vivek as Hospital Receptionist
Tisca Chopra as Rhea
Kiran Randhawa as Kiran's landlady
Kavita Vaid as Nurse Leela
Kunal Kumar as Rahul
Mukesh Tiwari as Rashmi's father-in-law
Seema Shinde as Dr. Simran Mathur / Dr. Simran Saxena's assistant 
Naresh Suri as Satya, Amla's husband; Saurabh's brother-in-law
Anju Mahendru as Amla, Satya's wife; Saurabh's sister; Simran, Kavita and Rashmi's aunt
Vivek Gomber as Harsh
Suzanne Bernert as Catherine
Shalaka Ranadive as Archana Sareen - Sia (Aastha's kidnapper) dead, died in hospital after car accident
Seema Bhargava as Archana's mother, Sia's grandmother
Natasha Rana as Dr. Brian's wife
Akshay Anand as Anil Shourey, Kiran's ex-boyfriend
Daya Shankar Pandey as Inspector
Richa Bhattacharya as Patient
Romit Raj as Yash Kapoor (Saxena)

Production
The series had a crossover with Reth.

Awards

2003 3rd Indian Television Academy Awards

Best Actress (Drama) - Niki Aneja Walia as Dr. Simran Mathur

Best Director (Drama) - Ajai Sinha

2005 2nd Apsara Awards

Best Drama Series - Astitva...Ek Prem Kahani

Best Actress - Niki Aneja Walia as Dr. Simran Mathur / Saxena

Best Actor - Varun Badola as Abhimanyu Saxena / Anand

2005 Indian Television Academy Awards

Best Actor (Drama) - Varun Badola as Abhimanyu Saxena / Anand

Best Teleplay - Astitva...Ek Prem Kahani - Gajra Kottary & Purnendu Shekhar

References

External links
Official site on IMDb.com
Full episodes on Rajshri.com

Indian television soap operas
Zee TV original programming
2002 Indian television series debuts
2006 Indian television series endings